Aroha G. Harris is a Māori (Te Rarawa, Ngāpuhi) academic. As of 2020, Harris is an associate professor at the University of Auckland, specialising in Māori histories of policy and community development. She is also a member of the Waitangi Tribunal.

Early life 
Harris was born to parents Margaret née Leef and Milton Harris, a truck driver. She grew up in Te Atatū South, and was educated at St Joseph's Māori Girls' College in Napier. She credits her paternal grandmother, Violet Otene Harris, a Ngāpuhi and Mormon, as having a significant influence on her during childhood.

Academic career 

Harris has said that she studied history "partly because she’s a 'failed novelist' who wanted to write and be a storyteller". Harris completed an MPhil in social policy at Massey University titled Maori land development schemes, 1945–1974, with two case studies from the Hokianga in 1996. After a PhD titled Dancing with the state: Māori creative energy and policies of integration 1945–1967 at the University of Auckland in 2007, Harris was employed at the University of Auckland, where she is an associate professor.

Harris was a founding member of Te Pouhere Kōrero, the New Zealand national association for Māori historians. She is a co-editor of the Te Pouhere Kōrero journal.

Her first book, Hikoi: Forty Years of Māori Protest, was published in 2004. described political protest in the second half of the twentieth century, showing that individual protests are part of a cohesive movement. 

She was appointed as a member of the Waitangi Tribunal in 2008, and is a member of the Te Rohe Potae (Wai 898) panel.

Honours and awards 
In 2017 Harris was selected as one of the Royal Society Te Apārangi's 150 women in 150 words, celebrating the contributions of women to knowledge in New Zealand.

Tangata Whenua: an illustrated history, a book co-authored with Judith Binney and Atholl Anderson, won the Royal Society Science Book Prize in 2015, and the illustrated non-fiction category award in the 2016 Ockham New Zealand Book Awards.

A special Outstanding Contribution to Māori History award was given to Harris in 2021 at the New Zealand Historical Association Conference.

Selected works

References

External links 

 Profile of Harris at University of Auckland

New Zealand women historians
Members of the Waitangi Tribunal
Academic staff of the University of Auckland
University of Auckland alumni
20th-century New Zealand historians
Living people
Year of birth missing (living people)
Te Rarawa people
Ngāpuhi people
21st-century New Zealand historians